Fury Below is a 1936 American action film directed by Harry L. Fraser and written by Phil Dunham. The film stars Russell Gleason, Maxine Doyle, LeRoy Mason, Sheila Terry, Matthew Betz, Rex Lease and John Merton. The film was released on November 23, 1936, by Treo Film Exchanges.

Plot

Cast           
Russell Gleason as Jim Cole III
Maxine Doyle as Mary Norsen
LeRoy Mason as Fred Johnson
Sheila Terry as Claire Johnson
Matthew Betz as Dorsky
Rex Lease as Joe Norsen
John Merton as Emil
Ruth Findlay as Molly Hendricks 
Phil Dunham as Cole, Sr.
Elliott Sullivan as Coal Miner

References

External links
 

1936 films
1930s English-language films
American action films
1930s action films
Films directed by Harry L. Fraser
1930s American films